Wang Zhonglian (王仲廉) (1904–1991) was a KMT general from Jiangsu. His birthplace became part of Anhui in 1950. He was a graduate of the Whampoa Military Academy. He fought against the Imperial Japanese Army in Shanxi, Henan and Hubei. He commanded the 19th Army Group from April to September 1943 and the 31st Army Group from September 1943 to December 1946. He was later demoted to commander of the 26th Army, a position he held until July 1947. In August 1947, he was removed from command. In 1949, after the end of the Chinese Civil War, he immigrated to Taiwan, where he lived for the rest of his life.

References
Biography of Wang Zhonglian

1904 births
1991 deaths
National Revolutionary Army generals from Jiangsu